Garth McGimpsey  (born 17 July 1955) is an amateur golfer from Bangor, Northern Ireland.

Playing career
McGimpsey won The Amateur Championship in 1985. He beat Graham Homewood, England, 8 and 7 in the final at Royal Dornoch Golf Club, Sutherland, Scotland.

His win gave an invitation to the Masters in 1986 and 1987 but he failed to make the cut on either occasion. He also played in The Open Championship in 1985 and 1986 but failed to make the cut.

He was part of the winning Great Britain and Ireland team at the 1988 Eisenhower Trophy and the winning Ireland teams at the 1983 and 1987 European Amateur Team Championship. He represented  the combined Northern Ireland and Republic of Ireland team at ten consecutive European Amateur Team Championships.

McGimpsey was the Irish long driving champion in 1977 and the United Kingdom long driving champion in 1979.

Captaincy career
He was appointed captain for the 2003 and 2005 Great Britain and Ireland Walker Cup teams.

Personal life
McGimpsey was made a Member of the Order of the British Empire in the 2004 New Year Honours.

In 2004, McGimpsey was charged after having cocaine delivered to his home but was cleared of having any links to the drugs.

Amateur wins
1985 The Amateur Championship, Irish Amateur
1988 Irish Amateur

Senior amateur wins
2010 Ulster Seniors
2011 Irish Senior Close,  Ulster Seniors
2012 Irish Senior Close,  Ulster Seniors
2013 Irish Senior Close, Connacht Seniors
2014 Ulster Seniors
2015 Ulster Seniors
2016 Ulster Seniors, Connacht Seniors, Munster Seniors
2017 Ulster Seniors
2019 Munster Seniors

Team appearances
Amateur
European Amateur Team Championship (representing Ireland): 1981, 1983 (winners), 1985, 1987 (winners), 1989, 1991, 1993, 1995, 1997, 1999
Walker Cup (representing Great Britain and Ireland): 1985, 1989 (winners), 1991, 2003 (non-playing captain), 2005 (non-playing captain)
Eisenhower Trophy (representing Great Britain and Ireland): 1984, 1986, 1988 (winners)
St Andrews Trophy (representing Great Britain and Ireland): 1984 (winners), 1986 (winners), 1988 (winners), 1990 (winners), 1992 (winners), 2002 (non-playing captain), 2004 (non-playing captain)

References

Male golfers from Northern Ireland
Amateur golfers
Members of the Order of the British Empire
1955 births
Living people